Camp Nowhere is a 1994 American adventure comedy film directed by Jonathan Prince, written by Andrew Kurtzman and Eliot Wald, and stars Christopher Lloyd, Jonathan Jackson and Jessica Alba in her film debut.

Plot 
12-year-old Morris "Mud" Himmel has a problem: his parents want to send him away to a summer computer camp. He hates going to summer camp and will do anything to get out of it. Talking to his friends, he realizes that they are all facing the same sentence of going to a boring summer camp. Together, they hatch a plan to create their own summer camp with no parents, no counselors, and no rules. Word gets out and other kids soon want to join the made-up summer camp. Mud decides to blackmail former drama teacher Dennis Van Welker into helping; he had bought an AMC Gremlin and failed to make most of the payments and is being pursued by soon-to-retire collector T.R. Polk, and agrees to help them in return for $1,000 and after they threaten to turn him in if he doesn't help.

With Dennis' help, the kids trick all the parents into sending them to the camp, and then rent an old campground (that used to be a hippie commune back in the 1960s and '70s) with a cabin on a lake. Some parents believe it is a computer camp, while others believe it is a fat camp, military camp, or an acting camp. The kids use the money their parents had paid for camp to buy toys and food. After a little while, they get bored and wonder if they should just return home. Mud goes to Dennis for help, and with a bribe, he soon finds ways to keep things interesting and help them continue to have fun.

Eventually, the parents want to come visit their kids despite being told that there are no parents' days. Mud makes a plan to trick them and, along with his friends, they keep the camp concealed. In a matter of hours, they fix it up and set up different scenarios representing the different camps (fat camp, computer camp, military camp, etc.) Their plan works and the parents don't suspect a thing. T.R. Polk then meets a state trooper who was also seeking Dennis, and they find their way into the camp and catch him. The police are called and Mud finds Dennis running away from the authorities. Mud is confronted by the police and protects Dennis from them, but soon after Dennis turns himself in. Mud confesses and explains that the whole thing was his idea, and uses the rest of the money to settle Dennis' debt with T.R. Polk, who'll retire with a perfect record. The other kids in a show of solidarity also claim responsibility and therefore all the parents refuse to press charges. Dennis gets off the hook and the kids leave for home, having had the greatest summer of their lives. Mostly Mud is punished by his parents because of this scheme.

Cast 
 Jonathan Jackson as Morris "Mud" Himmel
 Christopher Lloyd as Dennis Van Welker
 Andrew Keegan as Zack Dell
 Marnette Patterson as Trish Prescott
 Melody Kay as Gaby Nowicki
 Wendy Makkena as Dr. Celeste Dunbar
 Thomas F. Wilson as Lt. Eliot Hendricks
 M. Emmet Walsh as T.R. Polk
 Joshua G. Mayweather as Walter
 Hillary Tuck as Betty Stoller
 Devin Neil Oatway as Tim
 Allison Mack as Heather
 Nathan Cavaleri as Steve
 Jessica Alba as Gail
 Peter Scolari as Donald Himmel
 Michael Zorek as Chez Cheez Guy
 Ian Christopher Scott as Warren
 Heather DeLoach as Eileen
 Paige Andree as Jill
 Leah Theresa Hanner as Debbie
 Mooky Arizona as Arnold Spiegel
 Kazz Wingate IV as Pete
 Kellen McLaughlin as J.D.
 Brian Wagner as Lenny
 Nicolas Friedman as Ricky
 Alyssa Poblador as Nicole
 Krystle and Tiffany Mataras as Amber and Ashley
 Romy Windsor as Nancy Himmel
 Ray Baker as Norris Prescott
 Kate Mulgrew as Rachel Prescott
 John Putch as Neil Garbus
 Burgess Meredith as Fein
 Maryedith Burrell as Gwen Nowicki
 Genie Francis as Mrs. Spiegel
 Jonathan Frakes as Bob Spiegel
 Peter Onorati as Karl Dell

Reception 
On Rotten Tomatoes the film has a score of 17% based on reviews from 12 critics. Audiences surveyed by CinemaScore gave the film a grade "B" on scale of A to F.

Janet Maslin of The New York Times gave the film a positive review. Maslin thought it could have been predictable and awful but that it had "a funny screenplay", "good-humored direction", and "a nice young cast" who "have television experience, and they bring a sturdy, no-frills professionalism to their roles".
Hal Hinson of The Washington Post gave it a positive review, and wrote: "Instead of the usual coming-of-age coarseness, this celebration of kid power is a rather tame affair. It's sweet, likable and even vaguely hip."

Brian Baker of the Austin Chronicle gave it 2 out of 5, and was critical of the plot. He says "It depends mostly on Lloyd's crazy characters to hold the narrative together and that works for a brief moment early in the film" and that "No kid is going to buy into a movie that revolves around a geek who isn't a geek and a fat girl who isn't fat."
Chris Hicks of the Deseret News wrote: "The youngsters in the cast are appealing and the film is amusing, though it never quite builds up the head of steam it seems to be aiming for."

Home media
Camp Nowhere was released on VHS on June 6, 1995, and released on DVD August 5, 2003. Mill Creek Entertainment released the film on Blu-ray on October 11, 2011. Kino Lorber released the film on DVD and Blu-ray April 17, 2018.

References

External links 
 

1990s teen comedy films
1994 films
American teen comedy films
Hollywood Pictures films
Films about summer camps
1994 directorial debut films
1994 comedy films
1990s English-language films
1990s American films